Leopold Hoesch may refer to:

 Leopold Hoesch (film producer) (born 1969), German film producer
 Leopold Hoesch (entrepreneur), German entrepreneur

See also
 Leopold von Hoesch (1881–1936), German diplomat